Riddhi Sen is an Indian film actor who predominantly works in Bengali films. He is a regular actor of the theatre group Swapnasandhani and is an alumnus of South Point school, Kolkata. In 2010, he received a special talent award from his school for his achievements in the field of theatre. He is the youngest actor in India to receive the National Film Award for Best Actor for his performance in the film Nagarkirtan. In 2019, Film Companion ranked Sen's performance in Nagarkirtan among 100 Greatest Performances of the decade.

Early life

Born in Kolkata, Riddhi Sen is the son of Bengali stage and film actor Kaushik Sen and dancer Reshmi Sen, and grandson of actress Chitra Sen and actor Shyamal Sen. Sen has acted on stage from an early age, with his grandmother saying "From a very tender age he is performing at ‘Prachya’, I remember carrying him through the crowds at the age of 3."

Filmography

YouTube short films
Satya dar coaching

Theatre performances
 Prachya 
 Dakghor (directed by Kaushik Sen)
 Banku Babur Bandhu (directed by Kaushik Sen)
 Bhalo Rakkhosher Golpo (directed by Kaushik Sen)
 Krironok
Dushman No.1 (directed by Suman Mukhopadhyay)
 Birpurush (2010)
 Macbeth (2012 Bengali theatre, based on Shakespeare's play Macbeth, directed by Kaushik Sen; Riddhi Sen played the role of one of the three witches)
 In mid-2012 Sen played the role of young Andrea in Anjan Dutt's Bengali theatre adoption of Bertolt Brecht's Life of Galileo.
 Drohokaal (Directed by Kaushik Sen)
 Ashwathama, directed by Kaushik Sen based on Manoj Mitra's play Ashwathama; Riddhi Sen played the role of Ashwathama.
 Taraye Taraye, directed by Kaushik Sen based on Srijato's novel Tara Bhora Akasher Niche; Riddhi Sen played the role of Ritwik.

Web series

Sen's first directorial debut is a short film based on the author Nabarun Bhattacharya's short story, Coldfire, a dystopian dark comedy, which released in 2021.

Awards

National Film Award for Best Actor for Nagarkirtan
Award by Nehru Children's Museum, 2005.
Sundaram Award, 2008
Shera Bangali Award by ABP Ananda, Kalker Shera Ajke 2015.
18th Tele Cine Award,Best Actor Male for Nagarkirtan, 2019.
Best Rising Actor by Kalakar Awards for Helicopter Eela, 2019.
Best Actor for Nagarkirtan at SAARC in 2019

References

External links

 

Bengali male actors
Bengali Hindus
Living people
Indian male stage actors
21st-century Indian male actors
Male actors from Kolkata
1998 births
Best Actor National Film Award winners